The Individual normal hill/10 km event of the FIS Nordic World Ski Championships 2017 was held on 24 February 2017.

Results

Ski jumping
The ski jumping part was held at 10:30.

Cross-country skiing
The cross-country skiing part was held at 13:30.

References

Individual normal hill 10 km